Wells Fargo Gunmaster is a 1951 American Western film directed by Philip Ford and starring Allan Lane, Mary Ellen Kay and Chubby Johnson.

Plot

Cast

Production
The film's sets were designed by the art director Frank Hotaling.

References

Bibliography
 Pitts, Michael R. Western Movies: A Guide to 5,105 Feature Films.McFarland, 2012.

External links
 

1951 films
1951 Western (genre) films
American Western (genre) films
Films directed by Philip Ford
Republic Pictures films
American black-and-white films
1950s English-language films
1950s American films